José Luis Jiménez Marín (born 8 August 1983), nicknamed Guachupé, is a Chilean former professional footballer who played as a forward.

Club career
Jiménez played at Universidad de Chile youth ranks until 2003, but he left the team because he was not in the coach's plans. In 2003, he arrived to Deportes Talcahuano of the Chilean Primera B. In the next season, he arrived to Trasandino de Los Andes of the Tercera División Chilena. At the team of Los Andes, Jiménez was the top-scorer of the Tercera División with 26 goals.

During the summer of 2005, Jiménez was transferred to Santiago Wanderers of the Primera División Chilena, because of his good performance in Tercera División. In the first season, Jiménez played very few matches and at times was not in the plans of coach Carlos González, but because the departure of González, the new coach Mario Soto had his sights set on Jiménez. In 2007, Wanderers was relegated to Primera B and Jiménez canceled his contract with the club, having to pay 15 million pesos. He then signed with C.D. Universidad de Concepción for a one-year deal in January 2008.

In the first season of Jiménez in the club, he scored 2 goals in 8 games. In January 2009, Jiménez won his first professional title, the Copa Chile 2008–09.

In 2009, he was loaned to his former club Santiago Wanderers for a six-month deal. With Wanderers the player achieved the promotion to Primera División Chilena. Lengthening his loan for one year. However, in December 2011, Jiménez return to Universidad de Concepción.

In 2013, Jiménez was sent off, later being dismissed and having his contract torn up, for violently grabbing a dog that wandered onto the pitch by the neck and throwing it into a metal fence.

In April 2021, he announced his retirement from football activity after having played for eighteen years at professional level.

Club statistics

Honours

Club
Universidad de Concepción
 Primera B (1): 2013–T
 Copa Chile (1): 2008–09

Individual

Tercera División Top Scorer: 2004

References

External links

1983 births
Living people
People from Arauco Province
Chilean footballers
Naval de Talcahuano footballers
Trasandino footballers
Santiago Wanderers footballers
Universidad de Concepción footballers
Cobreloa footballers
Ñublense footballers
Santiago Morning footballers
Tercera División de Chile players
Chilean Primera División players
Primera B de Chile players
Association football forwards